La Courte Paille (The Short Straw), FP 178, is a set of seven songs for voice and piano, composed in 1960 by Francis Poulenc on poems by Maurice Carême. The duration of the work is about 8 minutes.

History of the work 
Composed in July–August 1960, the songs were premiered at the festival of Royaumont Abbey, in 1961, by soprano Colette Herzog and Jacques Février as the pianist.

Titles 
 Le sommeil
 Quelle aventure !
 La reine de cœur
 Ba, be, bi, bo, bu
 Les anges musiciens
 Le carafon
 Lune d'avril

Origin of the poems  
Le sommeil, Ba, be, bi, bo, bu and Le carafon come from the collection of Maurice Carême La Cage aux grillons (1959).

Quelle aventure ! , La reine de cœur, Les anges musiciens and Lune d'avril come from the collection Le Voleur d'étincelles (1960).

Dedicatee 
La Courte Paille is dedicated to the singer Denise Duval (1921–2016) for her son Richard Schilling.

Discography 
 Fiançailles pour rire ; La Courte Paille - Colette Herzog (soprano) and Jacques Février (piano) - Deutsche Grammophon, 1963.
 3 et 6 : Les Nuits d'été ; mélodies - Régine Crespin (soprano) and John Wustman (piano) - Decca Records, 1967.
 La Dame de Monte Carlo ; La Courte Paille - Mady Mesplé (soprano) and Gabriel Tacchino (piano) - EMI Group, 1986.
 Mélodies - Elly Ameling (soprano) and Dalton Baldwin (piano) - EMI Group, 1991.
 Voyage à Paris - Frederica von Stade (mezzo-soprano) and Martin Katz (piano) - BMG France, 1995.
 Mélodies - Felicity Lott (soprano) and Pascal Rogé (piano) - Decca Records, 1998.

References 

Clifton, Keith E. "Beyond Childhood: Poulenc, La courte paille, and the Aural Envelope." College Music Symposium 49/50 (2009/2010): 333-44.

External links 
 Francis Poulenc (1899-1963) - La courte paille on YouYube 
 La Courte Paille, cycle de mélodies ? by Joelle Brun-Cosme
 Francis Poulenc sur La courte paille on INA.fr (26 February 1961)
 La courte paille, FP178 on Hyperion with French lyrics and English translations

Mélodies
Piano
Compositions by Francis Poulenc
1960 compositions